, better known as , is a Japanese actor, voice actor and narrator from Kanagawa Prefecture. He is affiliated with Aoni Production.

He had roles in the Initial D series (as Jōshima Toshiya "God Hand"), Naruto (as Might Guy), Eat-Man (as Bolt Crank), the Shakugan no Shana series (as Alastor the Flame of Heavens), Bakusō Kyōdai Let's & Go!! (as Doctor Tsuchiya), Buso Renkin (as Captain Bravo), The Transformers (as Ratchet) and Final Fantasy XIII (as Sazh Katzroy). He is also the official dub-over artist of Tom Hanks, Bill Murray, Wesley Snipes, Bruce Campbell and Robin Williams. He was also the first dubbing voice actor of Andy García and Alec Baldwin in their early days. Much of his roles are occupied by Koichi Yamadera in different editions of the films.

Background
Ebara graduated from Tōkyōtoritsu Chitosegaoka Senior High School. He initially did not aspire to be an actor, but he chose to attend the Toho Performing Arts Academy to learn the trade because he admired the work of Charlie Chaplin as a student. After previously working with Gekidan Subaru, he affiliated himself with 81 Produce, but he is now affiliated with Aoni Production.

Filmography

Television animation
1987
Transformers: The Headmasters (Spike Witwicky, Scattershot/Computron, Pounce)
1990
Robin Hood no Daibōken (Baron Alwyn)
1991
Soreike! Anpanman (Unadonman, Pineappleman, Princess Dorian, Crayonman)
1992
O~i! Ryoma (Yamauchi Yōdō)
The Laughing Salesman (Kenzō Warii (episode 93), Shokudō no Oyaji (December 26, 1992 special))
1993
 Nintama Rantarō (Young Ryūōmaru, Heishirō Kusai)
1994
Pretty Soldier Sailor Moon R (Chiral)
Yu Yu Hakusho (Yomi)
1996
Baketsu de Gohan (Zubrofsky)
Bakusō Kyōdai Let's & Go!! (Doctor Tsuchiya)
Raideen the Superior (Kraken)
1997
Eat-Man (Bolt Crank)
1998
Eat-Man '98 (Bolt Crank)
1999
Cowboy Bebop (Andy Von de Oniyate)
Master Keaton (Robert Fenders)
Pocket Monsters (Jangō)
2000
Love Hina (Kōji Maehara)
Platinumhugen Ordian (Baltoro)
 Shūkan Storyland (Leader, narration)
2001
PaRappa Rappa (Boxy Boy)
Shaman King (Dōen)
The SoulTaker (Richard Vincent)
2002
Tottoko Hamtaro (Lion-sensei)
2003
Astro Boy: Mighty Atom (Archer)
Gad Guard (Jack Bruno)
Gunslinger Girl (Hilshire)
Mugen Senki Potorisu (Black-clothed man)
Naruto (Might Guy)
2004
Agatha Christie's Great Detectives Poirot and Marple (George Challenger)
Fullmetal Alchemist (Hohenheim Elric)
Kaiketsu Zorori (Gaon, Husky)
2005
Majime ni Fumajime: Kaiketsu Zorori (Gaon, Husky)
Shakugan no Shana (Alastor)
Shinshaku Sengoku Eiyūdensetsu Sanada Ten Braves The Animation (Kuroda Nagamasa)
Xenosaga: The Animation (Ziggurat 8)
2006
Demashita! Powerpuff Girls Z (Mojo Jojo)
Ergo Proxy (MCQ)
2007
El Cazador de la Bruja (Shop Manager)
Naruto: Shippuden (Might Guy, Might Duy)
Nodame Cantabile (Sebastiano Viella)
Shakugan no Shana Second (Alastor)
2008
Michiko to Hatchin (Old Gentleman)
Negibōzu no Satarō (Aona no Shakimi)
2011
 Shakugan no Shana Final (Alastor)
2012
Sword Art Online (Godfree)
2013
Magi: The Kingdom of Magic (Shambal Ramal)
Space Battleship Yamato 2199 (Osamu Yamanami)
2014
Future Card Buddyfight (Hitotaba Neginoyama/Captain Answer, Vlad Dracula)
Tokyo ESP (Shin Kakuno)
Nisekoi (Adlet Wogner Kirisaki)
2016
One Piece (Raizō)
2017
Space Battleship Yamato 2202: Warriors of Love (Osamu Yamanami)
Vatican Miracle Examiner (Archbishop Saul)
2018
Pop Team Epic (Popuko (Series 1 Episode 1-A, Series 1 Remix Episode 12-B), Daddy (live-action portrayal) (Series 2 Episode 1))
2019
No Guns Life (Christina Matsuzaki)
2021
Baki Hanma (Bob McCarthy)
2022
Life with an Ordinary Guy Who Reincarnated into a Total Fantasy Knockout (Narrator)

Unknown date
 Black Jack (Myū)
 Buso Renkin (Captain Bravo, Narrator)
 Crayon Shin-chan (Majī Di Gamecchini)
 Deltora Quest (Fallow, Prandine)
 Detective Conan (Keigo Endō, Yūji Mikasa)
 Fushigi no Umi no Nadia (Gonzales)
 Hakaba Kitarō (Johnny the Vampire)
 Initial D series (Jōshima Toshiya)
 Jungle King Tar-chan (Alan)
 Kamisama Kazoku (Osamu Kamiyama)
 Kasumin (Haruo Kirima)
 Kekkaishi (Kouya)
 Kodomo no Omocha (Rick, narration)
 Legendz: Tale of the Dragon Kings (Yul Hepburn)
 Love Get CHU ~Miracle Seiyū Hakusho~ (Kuroiwa)
 Madlax (Friday Monday)
 Magical Princess Minky Momo (Papa)
 Mashin Eiyūden Wataru (Thunder Blue)
 Obake no Horry (Nyangirasu, Mukimukin)
 Onegai My Melody ~ Kurukuru Shuffle!~ (Flat-kun's papa)
 Pokonyan (Papa (Shigeru Konoha), Chanpuku)
 PoPoLoCrois Monogatari (White Knight)
 Robin Hood no Daibōken (Lord Alwine)
 Soreike! Uchū Senkan Yamamoto Yōko (Meo-Toroll no Fūrigā)
 Yokoyama Mitsuteru Sangokushi (Xun Yu)

OVA
 Iczer Reborn (1990) (Rob)
 Legend of the Galactic Heroes (1991) (Rockwell)
 Armored Trooper Votoms: Kakuyakutaru Itan (1994) (Godiba)
 Vampire Hunter: The Animated Series (1997) (Bishamon)
 Detatoko Princess (1998) (Healthy three siblings)
 Le Portrait de Petit Cossette (2004) (Marchello Orlando)

Unknown date
 .hack//Liminality (Jun'ichirō Tokuoka)
 FAKE (Berkeley Rose)
 Genocyber (Captain)
 Giant Robo The Animation – The Day the Earth Stood Still (Professor Go Gakujin)
 The Hakkenden (Chudai, Daisuke Kanamari)
 Jigoku Dō Reikai Tsūshin (Ghost)
 Kidō Senshi SD Gundam Hakobiya Rigazi no Kiseki (Gerugugu)
 Kidō Senshi SD Gundam SD Gundam Mō Race (Kozaku)
 Kidō Senshi SD Gundam Yume no Maron Sha (Sazaby)
 Sakura Taisen Gōka Kenran (Shigeki Kanzaki)
 SD Sengokuden Musha Shichinin Shuu Hen (Kozaku)
 Shakugan no Shana SP: Koi to Onsen no Kōgai Gakushū! (Lord of the Crimson Realm Alastor)
 Soreike! Uchū Senkan Yamamoto Yōko (Meo-Toroll no Fūrigā)

Theatrical animation
 Perfect Blue (1998) (Murano)
 Metropolis (2001) (Ham Egg)
 One Piece: Chopper's Kingdom on the Island of Strange Animals (2002) (Count Butler)
 Pokémon Heroes (2002) (Latios)
 Crayon Shin-chan: The Storm Called: Yakiniku Road of Honor (2003) (Chōkurō Shimoda)
 Bleach: Memories of Nobody (2006) (Ganryu)
 Naruto the Movie: Road to Ninja (2012) (Might Guy)
 Kizumonogatari II Nekketsu-hen (2016)
 The House of the Lost on the Cape (2021)

Unknown date
 Resident Evil: Degeneration (Frederic Downing)
 Shakugan no Shana (Lord of the Crimson Realm Alastor)
 A Tree of Palme (Gariko)

Video games
 Ace Combat 3 (1999)
 Ace Combat 5: The Unsung War (2004) (Seryozha Viktrovich Nikanor)
 Kingdom Hearts II (2005) (Lumiere)
 Final Fantasy XIII (2009) (Sazh Katzroy)
 Metal Gear Rising: Revengeance (2013) (Monsoon)
 Soulcalibur VI (2018) (Azwel)
 Dragon Ball Z: Kakarot (2020) (Mr. Satan)

Unknown date
 Aba Renbō Princess (Henry Orion)
 Asura's Wrath (Deus)
 Atelier Viorate ~Alchemist of Gramnad 2~ (Offen Schwach)
 Beyond: Two Souls (Cole Freeman) (Japanese dub)
 Brave Fencer Musashi (Yami no Majin, Reigando, Rento, Rūmu)
 Dairantō Smash Brothers X (Latios)
 Dark Sector (Robert Mezner)
 Dengeki Gakuen RPG: Cross of Venus (Alastor)
 Initial D Arcade Stage series (Jōshima Toshiya)
 Heart of Darkness (Amigo, Servant)
 JoJo's Bizarre Adventure: All-Star Battle (Mohammed Avdol)
 Kabu Trader Shun (Tōru Narasaki)
 The Legend of Xanadu series (Daimos)
 Nanatsuiro Drops Pure!! (Lord of the Crimson Realm Alastor)
 PoPoLoCrois Monogatari II (White Knight)
 Remember 11: The Age of Infinity (Seiji Yomogi)
 Sakura Taisen 2 ~Kimi, Shinitamō koto Nakare~ (Shigeki Kanzaki)
 Scandal (Ryō)
 Shadow Hearts: From the New World (Ricardo Gomez)
 Shakugan no Shana (Lord of the Crimson Realm Alastor)
 Sly 3: Honor Among Thieves (Dr. M) (Japanese dub)
 Sonic and the Secret Rings (Erazor Djinn)
 Sō Raku Toshi Osaka (Iwai Sanjan)
 Spider-Man (Shocker, J. Jonah Jameson) (Japanese dub)
 Tales of Eternia (Fog, Shadow)
 Tales of Fandom Vol.1 (Fog)
 Tales of the World: Narikiri Dungeon 2 (Fog)
 Tales of the World: Narikiri Dungeon 3 (Fog)
 Tropico (Minister's secretary)
Warriors Orochi 4 (Ujiyasu Hojo) (replacing Unsho Ishizuka)
 Xenosaga I & II (Ziggurat 8)
 Xenosaga Episode I: Der Wille zur Macht (Ziggurat 8)
 Xenosaga Episode II: Jenseits von Gut und Böse (Ziggurat 8)
 Xenosaga Episode III: Also sprach Zarathustra (Ziggurat 8)
 Xenosaga Freaks (Ziggurat 8)
 Zone of the Enders (Nōman)

Puppetries
The Three Musketeers (2009–2010) (Aramis, M. de Tréville, Cardinal Richelieu)
Sherlock Holmes (2014) (Deputy Headmaster Moriarty, Barnicot)

TV drama
 Kashin (1977) (Issei Maebara)
 Kusa Moeru (1979) (Follower)
 Shōgun (1980) (Suga)
 Tokugawa Ieyasu (1983) (Attendant)

Tokusatsu
 Kamen Rider Black RX (1988)
 Gekisou Sentai Carranger (1996) (PP Rappa (ep. 11))
 Kaizoku Sentai Gokaiger (2011) (Dyrandoh (ep. 41 – 44, 49 – 51))
 Rider Time Shinobi (2019) (Yami Shinobi)

Radio drama
 Kerberos Panzer Jäger (2006) (Captain Deisler)

CD
 Buso Renkin (????) (Captain Bravo)
 The Legend of Xanadu II: Heroine-tachi no Tanjōbi (????) (Daimos)
 Xenosaga Outer File (????) (Ziggurat 8)

Dubbing roles

Live-action
 Tom Hanks
 Sleepless in Seattle (1997 Fuji TV edition) (Sam Baldwin)
 Forrest Gump (VHS/DVD and 2000 Fuji TV editions) (Forrest Gump)
 Apollo 13 (VHS/DVD and 2003 Fuji TV editions) (Jim Lovell)
 Saving Private Ryan (VHS/DVD edition) (Captain John H. Miller)
 You've Got Mail (2001 Fuji TV edition) (Joe Fox)
 The Green Mile (VHS/DVD and 2002 Fuji TV editions) (Paul Edgecomb)
 Road to Perdition (Michael Sullivan, Sr.)
 Catch Me If You Can (Carl Hanratty)
 The Ladykillers (G.H. Dorr, Ph. D)
 The Terminal (VHS/DVD and Fuji TV editions) (Viktor Navorski)
 The Da Vinci Code (DVD/BD and 2009 Fuji TV editions) (Robert Langdon)
 Charlie Wilson's War (Charlie Wilson)
 Angels & Demons (Robert Langdon)
 Extremely Loud and Incredibly Close (Oskar Schell)
 Captain Phillips (Richard Phillips)
 Bridge of Spies (James B. Donovan)
 Inferno (Robert Langdon)
 A Hologram for the King (Alan Clay)
Sully (2020 The Cinema edition) (Chesley "Sully" Sullenberger)
 The Circle (Eamon Bailey)
 The Post (Ben Bradlee)
 A Beautiful Day in the Neighborhood (Fred Rogers)
 Greyhound (Captain Ernest Krause)
 Brain Games (Tom Hanks)
News of the World (Captain Jefferson Kyle Kidd)
Finch (Finch Weinberg)
Elvis (Col. Tom Parker)
Pinocchio (Geppetto)
 Bill Murray
 Stripes (John Winger)
 Scrooged (Francis Xavier "Frank" Cross)
 Ghostbusters II (1992 Fuji TV edition) (Doctor Peter Venkman)
 Mad Dog and Glory (Frank Milo)
 Ed Wood (Bunny Breckinridge)
 Kingpin (Ernie McCracken)
 Larger than Life (Jack Corcoran)
 Space Jam (Bill Murray)
 The Man Who Knew Too Little (Wallace Ritchie)
 Wild Things (DVD edition) (Kenneth Bowden)
 Cradle Will Rock (Tommy Crickshaw)
 Charlie's Angels (John Bosley)
 Lost in Translation (Bob Harris)
 The Darjeeling Limited (The Businessman)
 The Monuments Men (Sgt. Richard Campbell)
 St. Vincent (Vincent MacKenna)
 On the Rocks (Felix Keane)
 Ant-Man and the Wasp: Quantumania (Lord Krylar)
 Robin Williams
 Good Morning, Vietnam (1993 Fuji TV edition) (Adrian Cronauer)
 Dead Poets Society (1994 Fuji TV edition) (John Keating)
 Mrs. Doubtfire (1998 Fuji TV edition) (Daniel Hillard)
 Jumanji (VHS/DVD/Blu-ray, 1998 Fuji TV and 2000 TV Asahi editions) (Alan Parrish)
 Nine Months (Dr. Kosevich)
 Jack (2001 Fuji TV edition) (Jack Powell)
 Jakob the Liar (Jakob)
 Bicentennial Man (VHS/DVD edition) (Andrew Martin)
 Insomnia (2006 TV Tokyo edition) (Walter Finch)
 One Hour Photo (Sy Parrish)
 House of D (Pappas)
 Man of the Year (Tom Dodds)
 RV (Bob Munro)
 Wesley Snipes
 Demolition Man (Simon Phoenix)
 Drop Zone (1998 TV Asahi edition) (Pete Nessip)
 Money Train (VHS/DVD and 2001 TV Asahi editions) (John)
 The Fan (1998 TV Asahi edition) (Bobby Rayburn)
 Murder at 1600 (1999 TV Asahi edition) (Detective Harlan Regis)
 One Night Stand (Maximilian Carlyle)
 Futuresport (Obike Fixx)
 U.S. Marshals (2001 TV Asahi edition) (Mark J. Sheridan/Warren/Roberts)
 Disappearing Acts (Franklin Swift)
 Undisputed (Monroe "Undisputed" Hutchen)
 The Expendables 3 (Doctor Death)
 Dolemite Is My Name (D'Urville Martin)
 Coming 2 America (Gen. Izzi)
 Eddie Murphy
 Best Defense (Lieutenant T.M. Landry)
 Beverly Hills Cop III (VHS/DVD edition) (Detective Axel Foley)
 Vampire in Brooklyn (VHS edition) (Maximillian, Preacher Pauly, Guido)
 The Nutty Professor (VHS/DVD edition) (Professor Sherman Klump, Buddy Love, Cletus 'Papa' Marcellus Klump, Anna Pearl 'Mama' Jensen Klump, Ida Mae 'Granny' Jensen, Ernie Klump Senior)
 Dr. Dolittle (VHS/DVD edition) (Doctor John Dolittle)
 Bowfinger (Kit Ramsey/Jiffrenson 'Jiff' Ramsey)
 Life (Ray Gibson)
 Nutty Professor II: The Klumps (VHS/DVD edition) (Professor Sherman Klump, Buddy Love, Cletus 'Papa' Marcellus Klump, Anna Pearl 'Mama' Jensen Klump, Ida Mae 'Granny' Jensen, Ernie Klump Senior, Lance Perkins)
 Dr. Dolittle 2 (VHS/DVD edition) (Doctor John Dolittle)
 Meet Dave (Dave Ming-Chang, The Captain)
 Imagine That (Evan Danielson)
 Will Smith
 Men in Black (VHS/DVD edition) (Agent J)
 Men in Black II (VHS/DVD edition) (Agent J)
 The Pursuit of Happyness (DVD edition) (Chris Gardner)
 I Am Legend (Lieutenant Colonel Robert Neville)
 Hancock (DVD edition) (John Hancock)
 Men in Black 3 (Agent J)
 Gemini Man (Henry Brogan)
 Andy García
 The Untouchables (1990 Fuji TV edition) (George Stone)
 Black Rain (1996 Fuji TV edition) (Detective Charlie Vincent)
 The Godfather Part III (1994 Fuji TV edition) (Vincent Mancini-Corleone)
 Hero (VHS/DVD and 1997 NTV editions) (John Bubber)
 Steal Big Steal Little (Ruben Partida Martinez, Robert Martin, Narrator)
 Things to Do in Denver When You're Dead (Jimmy 'The Saint' Tosnia)
 Alec Baldwin
 The Hunt for Red October (1999 TV Asahi edition) (Jack Ryan)
 Malice (1996 TV Tokyo edition) (Doctor Jed Hill)
 The Getaway (Doc McCoy)
 The Shadow (Lamont Cranston / The Shadow)
 Mercury Rising (VHS/DVD edition) (Lieutenant Colonel Nicholas Kudrow)
 Thomas and the Magic Railroad (Mr. Conductor)
 Bruce Campbell
 Spider-Man (Ring announcer)
 Spider-Man 2 (Snooty usher)
 Spider-Man 3 (French maître d')
 Burn Notice (Sam Axe)
 Ash vs Evil Dead (Ash Williams)
 Doctor Strange in the Multiverse of Madness (Pizza Poppa vendor)
 Willem Dafoe
 Speed 2: Cruise Control (John Geiger)
 The Boondock Saints (Agent Paul Smecker)
 Auto Focus (John Henry Carpenter)
 The Boondock Saints II: All Saints Day (Agent Paul Smecker)
 Daybreakers (Lionel "Elvis" Cormac)
 Vince Vaughn
 Dodgeball: A True Underdog Story (Peter LaFleur)
 Mr. & Mrs. Smith (2010 TV Asahi edition) (Eddie)
 The Break-Up (Gary Grobowski)
 The Watch (Bob McAllister)
 Freaky (The Butcher)
 Michael Moore
 Bowling for Columbine
 Fahrenheit 9/11
 Sicko
 8mm (Tom Welles (Nicolas Cage))
 16 Blocks (2009 TV Asahi edition) (Edward Bunker (Mos Def))
 The Absent-Minded Professor (Professor Shelby Ashton (Elliott Reid))
 The Abyss (1991 Fuji TV edition) (Lieutenant Hiram Coffey (Michael Biehn))
 Ace Ventura: Pet Detective (Ace Ventura (Jim Carrey))
 Ace Ventura: When Nature Calls (Ace Ventura (Jim Carrey))
 Alien vs. Predator (Graeme Miller (Ewen Bremner))
 Aliens (VHS/DVD edition) (Private William Hudson (Bill Paxton))
 Aliens (1988 TBS edition) (Private Mark Drake (Mark Rolston))
 Aliens (2004 TV Asahi edition) (Carter J. Burke (Paul Reiser))
 Alive (Roberto Canessa (Josh Hamilton))
 Ally McBeal (John Cage (Peter MacNicol))
 Always (Ted Baker (Brad Johnson))
 The Animal (Marvin Mange (Rob Schneider))
 Anne of Green Gables (Mister Phillips (Paul Brown))
 Annie: A Royal Adventure! (Rupert Hogbottom (Crispin Bonham-Carter))
 Armageddon (2002 Fuji TV edition) (Colonel Lev Andropov (Peter Stormare)
 Armageddon (2004 NTV edition) (Lieutenant General Kimsey (Keith David))
 Armour of God II: Operation Condor (1995 TV Asahi edition) (Frank the Guard)
 Around the World in 80 Days (Inspector Fix (Ewen Bremner))
 As Good as It Gets (Frank Sachs (Cuba Gooding Jr.))
 Assassins (1999 Fuji TV edition) (Miguel Bain (Antonio Banderas))
 Babe (2001 NTV edition) (Ferdinand the Duck (Danny Mann))
 Baby's Day Out (Edgar "Eddie" Mauser (Joe Mantegna))
 Back to the Future Part II (Goldie Wilson III (Donald Fullilove))
 Bad Boys (VHS/DVD edition) (Captain Howard (Joe Pantoliano))
 Bad Boys II (DVD edition) (Captain Howard (Joe Pantoliano))
 Bad Boys for Life (Captain Howard (Joe Pantoliano))
 Batman (1995 TV Asahi edition) (Alexander Knox (Robert Wuhl))
 Bean (2000 Fuji TV edition) (David Langley (Peter MacNicol))
 Beethoven (1995 NTV edition) (Vernon (Stanley Tucci))
 Bella Martha (Mario (Sergio Castellitto))
 Big (Paul Davenport (John Heard))
 The Big Hit (Cisco (Lou Diamond Phillips))
 Big Momma's House (Malcolm Turner (Martin Lawrence))
 Big Momma's House 2 (Malcolm Turner (Martin Lawrence))
 Big Mommas: Like Father, Like Son (Malcolm Turner (Martin Lawrence))
 Big Night (Secondo (Stanley Tucci))
 Blood Simple (Ray (John Getz))
 Boomerang (1996 Fuji TV edition) (Tyler (Martin Lawrence))
 Born on the Fourth of July (VHS edition) (Steve Boyer (Jerry Levine))
 The Bourne Identity (2006 Fuji TV edition) (The Professor (Clive Owen))
 The Cable Guy (Chip Douglas (Jim Carrey))
 Casper: A Spirited Beginning (Tim Carson (Steve Guttenberg))
 Category 6: Day of Destruction (Craig Shilts (Christopher Shyer))
 Cedar Rapids (Dean Ziegler (John C. Reilly))
 Cellular (2007 TV Asahi edition) (Lawyer (Rick Hoffman))
 Charlie's Angels: Full Throttle (Jimmy Bosley (Bernie Mac))
 Charlie's Angels (2019) (Edgar "Bosley" Dessange (Djimon Hounsou))
 Chasing Sleep (Ed Saxon (Jeff Daniels))
 Cinema Paradiso (Ignazio)
 City Slickers II: The Legend of Curly's Gold (Mitch Robbins (Billy Crystal))
 The Client (Barry "The Blade" Muldano (Anthony LaPaglia))
 Constantine (2008 TV Asahi edition) (Balthazar (Gavin Rossdale))
 Contact (2001 TV Tokyo edition) (Kent Cullers (William Fichtner))
 Copycat (Daryll Lee Cullum (Harry Connick Jr.))
 The Counselor (Reiner (Javier Bardem))
 Crash Dive (1999 Fuji TV edition) (James Carter (Michael Dudikoff))
 Crash Dive 2 (2001 Fuji TV edition) (James Carter (Michael Dudikoff))
 Creepshow (Harry Wentworth (Ted Danson))
 CSI: Cyber (Simon Sifter (Peter MacNicol))
 Cutthroat Island (1998 Fuji TV edition) (Ainslee (Patrick Malahide))
 The Dark Knight (2012 TV Asahi edition) (Anthony Garcia (Néstor Carbonell))
 The Day After Tomorrow (2006 TV Asahi edition) (Jack Hall (Dennis Quaid))
 Dead Ahead: The Exxon Valdez Disaster (Dan Lawn (John Heard))
 Desperate Housewives (Peter McMillian (Lee Tergesen))
 Die Hard (1990 TV Asahi edition) (Argyle (De'voreaux White)
 Die Hard (VHS/DVD edition) (Richard Thornburg (William Atherton))
 Die Hard 2 (VHS/DVD and 1994 TV Asahi editions) (Richard Thornburg (William Atherton))
 Double Dragon (Koga Shuko (Robert Patrick))
 Eat Pray Love (Felipe (Javier Bardem))
 Escape from L.A. (2000 Fuji TV edition) (Snake Plissken (Kurt Russell))
 Exit Wounds (2004 NTV edition) (Henry Wayne (Tom Arnold))
 The Exorcist III (1994 Fuji TV edition) (The Gemini Killer (Brad Dourif), Patient X (Jason Miller))
 The Exorcist III (VHS edition) (Dr. Bruno (Clifford David), Altar Boy (Kevin Corrigan))
 Face/Off (2000 Fuji TV edition) (Sean Archer (John Travolta))
 The Fall Guy (Howie Munson (Douglas Barr))
 Farewell My Concubine (Duan Xiaolou (Zhang Fengyi))
 Father of the Bride (Franck Eggelhoffer (Martin Short))
 Father of the Bride Part II (Franck Eggelhoffer (Martin Short))
 Fire Birds (1993 TV Asahi edition) (Jack Preston (Nicolas Cage))
 Firelight (Charles Godwin (Stephen Dillane))
 Firestorm (Jesse Graves (Howie Long))
 The Flash (Henry Allen (John Wesley Shipp))
 Freddy vs. Jason (VHS/DVD edition) (Freddy Krueger (Robert Englund))
 Frequency (2003 NTV edition) (Satch DeLeon (Andre Braugher))
 The Freshman (Victor Ray (Bruno Kirby))
 Friends (Benjamin Hobart (Greg Kinnear))
 The Full Monty (Lomper (Steve Huison))
 Geronimo: An American Legend (Charles B. Gatewood (Jason Patric))
 Get Smart (2011 TV Asahi edition) (Maxwell Smart (Steve Carell))
 Ghost (VHS/DVD and 1993 Fuji TV editions) (Sam Wheat (Patrick Swayze))
 G.I. Jane (2000 Fuji TV edition) (Command Master Chief John Urgayle (Viggo Mortensen))
 The Glimmer Man (DVD edition) (Jim Campbell (Keenen Ivory Wayans))
 Glory (1994 NTV edition) (Robert Gould Shaw (Matthew Broderick))
 Grace of My Heart (Joel Millner (John Turturro))
 Guarding Tess (Doug Chesnic (Nicolas Cage))
 The Grinch (Lou Lou Who (Bill Irwin))
 Hank Zipzer (Mr. Rock (Henry Winkler))
 Hard Boiled (VHS/DVD edition) (Inspector "Tequila" Yuen (Chow Yun-fat))
 Harry Potter series (Lord Voldemort (Ian Hart / Ralph Fiennes))
 Hellboy II: The Golden Army (Johann Krauss (Seth MacFarlane))
 Home Alone (1994 Fuji TV edition) (Marv Murchens (Daniel Stern))
 Home Alone 2: Lost in New York (1997 Fuji TV edition) (Marv Murchens (Daniel Stern))
 Home Alone 3 (2001 Fuji TV edition) (Burton Jernigan (Lenny Von Dohlen))
 I Now Pronounce You Chuck & Larry (Captain Phineas J. Tucker (Dan Aykroyd))
 Identity (2007 TV Tokyo edition) (Doctor Malick (Alfred Molina))
 Interview with the Vampire (1998 Fuji TV edition) (Lestat de Lioncourt (Tom Cruise))
 It Could Happen to You (Charlie Lang (Nicolas Cage))
 It Takes Two (Roger (Steve Guttenberg))
 The Jackal (2000 NTV edition) (Ian Lamont (Jack Black))
 Jerry Maguire (VHS/DVD edition) (Rod Tidwell (Cuba Gooding Jr.))
 JFK (1994 TV Asahi edition) (David Ferrie (Joe Pesci))
 Jingle All the Way (DVD edition) (Ted (Phil Hartman))
 Judge Dredd (1997 Fuji TV edition) (Fergie (Rob Schneider))
 Jungle 2 Jungle (Richard Kempster (Martin Short))
 Jurassic Park (Mister DNA)
 Jurassic World (Mr. DNA)
 Jurassic World (2017 NTV edition) (Simon Masrani (Irrfan Khan))
 Kindergarten Cop (1995 TV Asahi edition) (Cullen Crisp (Richard Tyson))
 A Knight's Tale (Geoffrey Chaucer (Paul Bettany))
 L.A. Confidential (2001 Fuji TV edition) (Jack Vincennes (Kevin Spacey))
 Lara Croft: Tomb Raider – The Cradle of Life (2006 TV Asahi edition) (Terry Sheridan (Gerard Butler))
 Last Action Hero (1996 Fuji TV edition) (Benedict (Charles Dance))
 The Last Boy Scout (1996 NTV edition) (James Alexander "Jimmy" Dix (Damon Wayans)
 The Last Boy Scout (1995 Fuji TV edition) (Milo (Taylor Negron)
 The Last Boy Scout (VHS/DVD edition) (Chet (Kim Coates), Billy Cole (Billy Blanks))
 The Living Daylights (1998 TV Asahi edition) (General Georgi Koskov (Jeroen Krabbé))
 Lock, Stock and Two Smoking Barrels (Tom (Jason Flemyng))
 The Long Kiss Goodnight (2000 Fuji TV edition) (Mitch Henessey (Samuel L. Jackson))
 A Love Song for Bobby Long (Bobby Long (John Travolta))
 Made in America (Hal Jackson (Ted Danson))
 The Man Who Invented Christmas (John Dickens (Jonathan Pryce))
 Mandela: Long Walk to Freedom (Nelson Mandela (Idris Elba))
 Martin (2018 Blu-ray edition) (Arthur (Tom Savini))
 The Matrix Reloaded (2006 Fuji TV edition) (Merovingian (Lambert Wilson))
 The Matrix Revolutions (2007 Fuji TV edition) (Merovingian (Lambert Wilson))
 The Matrix Resurrections (Merovingian (Lambert Wilson))
 Mission: Impossible (2003 TV Asahi edition) (Eugene Kittridge (Henry Czerny))
 Much Ado About Nothing (Don John (Keanu Reeves))
 The Mummy Returns (Fuji TV edition) (Jonathan Carnahan (John Hannah))
 The Muppets Take Manhattan (Fozzie Bear)
 Muppets Tonight (Fozzie Bear, Doctor Bunsen Honeydew, Snooky)
 The Muppets' Wizard of Oz (Fozzie Bear, Doctor Bunsen Honeydew)
 Murder, She Wrote (Brian East (Bryan Cranston))
 Mystery Date (Craig McHugh (Brian McNamara))
 Nanny McPhee (Cedric Brown (Colin Firth))
 Natural Born Killers (Jack Scagnetti (Tom Sizemore))
 The Negotiator (2001 TV Asahi edition) (Lieutenant Danny Roman (Samuel L. Jackson))
 Nemesis (Alex Raine (Olivier Gruner))
 The Net (Dr. Alan Champion (Dennis Miller))
 The NeverEnding Story II: The Next Chapter (TV Asahi edition) (Barney Bux (John Wesley Shipp))
 A Night in the Show (Mr. Pest and Mr. Rowdy (Charlie Chaplin))
 Night Watch (1999 Fuji TV edition) (Michael 'Mike' Graham (Pierce Brosnan))
 A Nightmare on Elm Street (1988 Fuji TV edition) (Freddy Krueger (Robert Englund))
 Panic Room (Raoul (Dwight Yoakam))
 The Pelican Brief (1996 TV Asahi edition) (Fletcher Coal (Tony Goldwyn))
 Platoon (1989 TV Asahi edition) (Junior)
 Powder (Donald Ripley (Jeff Goldblum))
 Predator (DVD edition) (Rick Hawkins (Shane Black))
 Predator 2 (Jerry Lambert (Bill Paxton))
 Prêt-à-Porter (Joe Flynn (Tim Robbins))
 The Punisher (Terrone (Todd Boyce))
 Red Dwarf (Arnold Rimmer (Chris Barrie))
 Resident Evil (VHS/DVD edition) (Spence Parks (James Purefoy))
 Resident Evil: Apocalypse (2007 Fuji TV edition) (Carlos Oliveira (Oded Fehr))
 Robin Hood: Prince of Thieves (1996 Fuji TV edition) (Robin Hood (Kevin Costner))
 RoboCop (1990 TV Asahi edition) (Leon Nash (Ray Wise))
 RoboCop 2 (1993 TV Asahi edition) (Mayor Kuzak (Willard E. Pugh))
 The Rocky Horror Picture Show (2010 Blu-ray edition) (Doctor Frank-N-Furter (Tim Curry))
 Rollerball (2005 TV Tokyo edition) (Marcus Ridley (LL Cool J))
 Roman Holiday (1994–2000 Fuji TV edition) (Mario Delani (Paolo Carlini))
 Romy and Michele's High School Reunion (Sandy Frink (Alan Cumming))
 Rules of Engagement (Major Mark Biggs (Guy Pearce))
 The Running Man (1990 TV Asahi edition) (Harold Weiss (Marvin J. McIntyre))
 Scent of a Woman (Charlie Simms (Chris O'Donnell))
 School of Rock (Dewey Finn (Jack Black))
 Screamers (2000 Fuji TV edition) (Private Ross (Charles Powell))
 Seed of Chucky (Redman)
 Shaft (Peoples Hernandez (Jeffrey Wright))
 The Shawshank Redemption (Heywood (William Sadler))
 Single White Female (Graham Knox (Peter Friedman))
 Sleepers (VHS/DVD edition) (Sean Nokes (Kevin Bacon))
 Sleepers (1999 Fuji TV edition) (Lorenzo "Shakes" Carcaterra (Jason Patric))
 Snow Queen (Polar bear)
 The Specialist (Tomas Leon (Eric Roberts))
 Species II (2002 Fuji TV edition) (Dennis Gamble (Mykelti Williamson))
 Speed (1997 Fuji TV edition) (Jack Traven (Keanu Reeves))
 Spielberg on Spielberg (Steven Spielberg)
 Step Brothers (Dale Doback (John C. Reilly))
 Street Fighter (Ryu Hoshi (Byron Mann))
 Supernatural (Crowley (Mark Sheppard))
 S.W.A.T. (2006 NTV edition) (Captain Thomas Fuller (Larry Poindexter))
 Target (Chris Lloyd (Matt Dillon))
 Telling Lies in America (Billy Magic (Kevin Bacon))
 Tequila and Bonetti (Nico "Nick" Bonetti (Jack Scalia))
 Terminal Velocity (Kerr (Christopher McDonald))
 Terminator 2: Judgment Day (1993 Fuji TV edition) (T-1000 (Robert Patrick))
 The Thomas Crown Affair (VHS/DVD edition) (Thomas Crown (Pierce Brosnan))
 Three Fugitives (Ned Perry (Martin Short))
 Thunderbirds Are Go (VHS edition) (Doctor Tony Grant (Bud Tingwell))
 Titanic (2001 Fuji TV edition) (Caledon Hockley (Billy Zane))
 Tomorrow Never Dies (2001 Fuji TV edition) (James Bond (Pierce Brosnan))
 Top Gun (1989 Fuji TV edition) (LTJG Nick "Goose" Bradshaw (Anthony Edwards))
 True Lies (VHS/DVD edition) (Simon (Bill Paxton))
 Twin Peaks (Albert Rosenfield (Miguel Ferrer))
 Ultraman: The Ultimate Hero (Rick Sanders)
 Ultraviolet (Daxus (Nick Chinlund))
 The Usual Suspects (Michael McManus (Stephen Baldwin))
 V.I. Warshawski (Murray Ryerson (Jay O. Sanders))
 Virus (2002 NTV edition) (Hiko (Cliff Curtis))
 Walk Hard: The Dewey Cox Story (Dewey Cox (John C. Reilly))
 Wall Street (1991 Fuji TV edition) (Bud Fox (Charlie Sheen))
 Wedding Crashers (United States Secretary of the Treasury William Cleary (Christopher Walken))
 White Noise (Jonathan Rivers (Michael Keaton))
 Windtalkers (VHS/DVD edition) (Private Pappas (Mark Ruffalo))
 A Woman (Gentleman (Charlie Chaplin))
 XXX (2007 TV Asahi edition) (Xander Cage (Vin Diesel))
 The Yellow Handkerchief (Brett Hanson (William Hurt))

Animation

 Brother Bear (Ram #2)
 Space Jam: A New Legacy (Sylvester)
 Thomas & Friends (James (Succeeding Katsuji Mori), The Thin Clergyman)
 WALL-E (AUTO)

References

External links
 Official agency profile 
 

1953 births
Living people
Aoni Production voice actors
Japanese male stage actors
Japanese male television actors
Japanese male video game actors
Japanese male voice actors
Male voice actors from Kanagawa Prefecture
81 Produce voice actors
20th-century Japanese male actors
21st-century Japanese male actors